Farahi (also Romanized as Farāhī; also known as Deh-e Farāhī) is a village in Qorqori Rural District, Qorqori District, Hirmand County, Sistan and Baluchestan Province, Iran. At the 2006 census, its population was 42, in 7 families.

References 

Populated places in Hirmand County